Senator Scanlon may refer to:

Eugene Scanlon (1924–1994), Pennsylvania State Senate
Joseph Scanlon (1924–1970), Pennsylvania State Senate
Charles V. Scanlan (1893–1964), New York State Senate